The Social Democratic Party (PSD) is the largest social democratic political party in Romania and also the largest overall political party in the country, aside from European Parliament level, where it is the second largest by total number of MEPs, after the National Liberal Party (PNL). It was founded by Ion Iliescu, Romania's first democratically elected president at the 1990 Romanian general election.

It is a member of the Progressive Alliance (PA), which was founded in 2013, Socialist International (SI), and Party of European Socialists (PES). As of 2014, the PSD had 509,000 members.

PSD traces its origins to the Democratic National Salvation Front (FDSN), a breakaway group established in 1992 from the center-left National Salvation Front (FSN) established after 1989. In 1993, this merged with three other parties to become the Party of Social Democracy in Romania (PDSR). The present name was adopted after a merger with the smaller Romanian Social Democratic Party (PSDR) in 2001.

Since its formation, it has always been one of the two dominant parties of the country. The PDSR governed Romania from 1992 to 1996, while the PSDR was a junior coalition partner between 1996 and 2000. The merged PSD was the senior party in the coalitions governing from 2000 to 2004, and from March 2014 to November 2015, as well as one of the main coalition partners between December 2008 and October 2009 (with the Democratic Liberal Party, PDL) and again between May 2012 and March 2014 (as part of the Social Liberal Union, USL). PSD left government after former Prime Minister, Victor Ponta resigned in November 2015, only for PSD to return as the senior governing party in January 2017, shortly after it achieved a major victory in the 2016 Romanian legislative election.

Party founder Ion Iliescu is the only PSD candidate to become President of Romania, he served in office from the 1989 to 1996, and again from 2000 to 2004.

Currently PSD is the largest party in the Parliament of Romania with initially 47 seats in the Senate of Romania and 110 seats in the Chamber of Deputies (as obtained at the 2020 Romanian legislative election), it also has the largest number of mayors, as well as the second largest number of local and county councillors and county presidents (after PNL), remaining the biggest and most influential political force in the country to the present day.

History 

Following the 27-29 May 1992 Convention of the National Salvation Front (FSN) when Petre Roman became President of the Party, former Party Leader Ion Iliescu and his group of supporters withdraw from FSN and founded the Democratic National Salvation Front (FDSN) wile the rest of FSN was renamed as the Democratic Party (Romanian: Partidul Democrat) in May 1993.

During its first National Conference on the 28th of June 1992, FDSN decided on supporting Ion Iliescu in the 1992 Romanian general election, which they later won and went on to govern Romania until 1996. On 10 July 1993, it took the name of Party of Social Democracy in Romania (PDSR) upon merger with the Socialist Democratic Party of Romania, the Republican Party, and the Cooperative Party.

From 1992 to 1996, the PDSR ruled in coalition with the Romanian National Unity Party (PUNR) and Greater Romania Party (PRM), and the left-wing Socialist Party of Labour (PSM), nicknemed by the Press as the Red Quadrilateral. The PUNR had ministers in the cabinet chaired by Nicolae Văcăroiu from March 1992 to September 1996. The PRM was not present at the cabinet-level but was given some posts in the state administration but which it retracted when it left the coalition in 1995.

PDSR went into opposition after the 1996 Romanian general election, which was won by the right-wing coalition Romanian Democratic Convention (CDR).

After four years of governmental turmoil and economic downfall, poorly managed by the crumbling CDR, saw PDSR making a fulminant comeback, winning the 2000 Romanian general election, this time in a coalition named the Social Democratic Pole of Romania (PDSR) along with the Romanian Social Democratic Party (PSDR) and the Romanian Humanist Party (PUR). The PSDR merged with PDSR on 16 June 2001, and the resulting party took the PSD name.

In November 2004, Adrian Năstase, the PSD candidate and incumbent Prime Minister of Romania, won the first round of the presidential elections but did not have a majority and had to go to a second round of voting, which he narrowly lost to Traian Băsescu of the opposition Justice and Truth Alliance (DA), who became Romania's 4th president. In the 2004 Romanian general election, the PSD gained the largest share of the vote but because it did not have a majority, the other parties that managed to enter parliament, UDMR/RMDSZ and PUR, abandoned their respective pre-electoral agreements with the PSD and joined the Justice and Truth Alliance (DA), mainly at the pressure of Băsescu. Mircea Geoană was elected president of the party in April 2005 by delegates at a PSD Party Congress held in Bucharest. His victory represented a surprise defeat for Iliescu, who was expected to defeat Geoană with ease. On 17 April 2008, the PSD and the PC announced they would form a political alliance for the 2008 Romanian local elections.

In February 2010, the Congress elected Victor Ponta as president after Geoană lost the 2009 Romanian presidential election. On 5 February 2011, the PSD formed a political alliance known as the Social Liberal Union (USL) with the PC and the National Liberal Party (PNL). The USL was disbanded on 25 February 2014 with exit of the PNL, which entered the opposition.

In July 2015, Liviu Dragnea was elected by the Congress of the PSD as the new president of the party, with 97% of the votes from the members. He was elected as leader after the former prime minister Victor Ponta stepped down on 12 July 2015 following charges of corruption that were later dropped. On 12 April 2019, the PSD was suspended from the Party of European Socialists (PES) following concerns about judicial reforms of the Dăncilă Cabinet. In May 2019, after Liviu Dragnea's jailing, Viorica Dăncilă was elected by the Congress of the PSD as the new president of the party.

After being ousted from power in October 2019, the PSD also lost the 2019 Romanian presidential election. Such decline sent shockwase across the European Union (EU), especially the PES, as it resulted in their loss of power within von der Leyen Commission. Nonetheless, Daniel Hegedüs posited that this could be a win for both the PES and the wider European left, as the PES would regain credibility because "mounting authoritarianism in Hungary and Poland has suffered under the burden of PSD's rule-of-law record". In addition, Hegedüs noted the fact that this could represent another chance for the PSD to reform itself and change its ways.

In August 2020, Marcel Ciolacu became president of the party (after having previously served for this position only as ad interim between November 2019 and August 2020). During the same month, the PSD was willing to vote a motion of no confidence against the second Orban cabinet. Shortly after December 2020, while still the largest party in the wake of the 2020 Romanian legislative election, the PSD suffered significant political capital losses (as they previously did in the 2020 Romanian local elections as well) given the chaotic and negative governmental activity the party was responsible for during the former legislature (more specifically during the years 2017 and 2019), yet remained the biggest parliamentary opposition well up until the end of 2021.

During the 2021 Romanian political crisis, the PSD was again willing to have such a vote, this time against the Cîțu Cabinet, which it subsequently did, thereby contributing to its final dismissal. In November 2021, successful negotiations with the PNL led the PSD closer to returning government in the incumbent Ciucă Cabinet within a grand coalition government known as the National Coalition for Romania (or CNR for short). The PSD is still governing Romania as of early 2022, albeit with major tensions in the said grand coalition.

In November 2022, the PSD agreed with the Moldovan European Social Democratic Party to begin a strategic partnership.

Predecessors and successors

Party splits 
 Alliance for Romania (1997)
 National Union for the Progress of Romania (2010)
 Romanian Social Party (2015)
 United Romania Party (2015)
 PRO Romania (2018)
 Romanian Nationhood Party (2019)
 Alliance for the Homeland (2021)

Absorbed parties 
 Republican Party (1993)1
 Cooperative Party (1993)1
 Romanian Socialist Democratic Party (1993)1
 Romanian Social Democratic Party (2001)2
 Alliance for Romania (2002)
 Socialist Party of Labour (2003)
 Socialist Party of the National Renaissance (2003)
 Romanian Social Party (2018)
 United Romania Party (2019)

 Notes
1 After the merger, the party changed its name from the Democratic National Salvation Front (FDSN) to the Party of Social Democracy in Romania (PDSR).

2 After the merger, the party changed its name from the Party of Social Democracy in Romania (PDSR) to the Social Democratic Party (PSD).

Ideology and platform 

Like its counterpart national-level members of the Party of European Socialists (PES), the PSD has a centre-left outlook and has been described as governing as centre-left, but has also been described as pragmatic, owing to its syncretic politics. The PSD was formed as a result of the merger of the Romanian Social Democratic Party (PSDR), which had an internationalist social-democratic ideology, with the Party of Social Democracy in Romania (PDSR), whose governance was marked by a combination of social democracy, democratic socialism, labourism, pragmatism, and nationalism. The 2003 absorption of the Socialist Party of Labour (PSM) and the Socialist Party of the National Renaissance (PSRN) led to the strengthening of the left-wing nationalism component within the party. Unlike the majority of Western European PES party members and as other like-minded centre-left, social democratic parties in Central and Eastern European post-Communism, it has taken a more soft Eurosceptic outlook, though it is neutral in regards to European integration. PSD stated that it supports EU and NATO membership. The party is more conservative than PES when it comes to social issues, reflecting the country's social-conservative outlook, including in its centre-right counterpart, the National Liberal Party (PNL). It has been described as a left-wing nationalist and left-wing populist social democratic party. Alongside Direction – Slovak Social Democracy, it has been described as the PES' "enfant terrible".

The party has been described as having centre-left rhetoric and economic policies, while being more conservative on personal and ethical matters. According to Florin Poenaru, "the movement led by Ion Iliescu was from the very beginning the party of local capitalists and not of the industrial proletariat. ... PSD was the party that aggregated the interests of the autochthonous capitalists, but whose electoral basis was the former industrial proletariat." Poenaru states that PSD never said no to the neoliberal agenda but applied it rather slowly. Andrei Pleșu once stated that the main post-Communist Romanian parties do not act according to some ideology or doctrine.

Political analyst Radu Magdin said that the PSD is "a catch-all party: its values are conservative, its economic policy is liberal and it has a social, left-leaning rhetoric when it comes to public policies." An example is their calls for both tax cuts and pensions and wages increase in 2016. Its more conservative outlook is owed to the social-conservative nature of post-Communist countries, and has been adopted by both the centre-left (PSD) and the centre-right (PNL). For Cornel Ban, Assistant Professor of International Relations at the Pardee School of Boston University, the PSD is an anomaly in Eastern Europe in that it was an ideal playground for right-wing populist parties but has seen the political left routinely win; this was in part because the political right and far-right were in government, including at the local level, during the post-Communist slumps which remained in the mind of many voters. Journalist Jean-Baptiste Chastand said that the PSD-led pro-European government in Romania took a national conservative turn, and expressed his fear that it could join the Eurosceptic Hungary and Poland. The historian Ioan Stanomir stated that PSD is a conservative party, that has nothing to do with the left, while journalist Bogdan Tiberiu Iacob described the party as progressive-conservative. PSD also opposed the mandatory refugee quotas. Journalist Daniel Mihăilescu labeled the party as national populist.

The party has strong connections with the Romanian Orthodox Church (BOR), reflecting the party's social conservatism.

Structure

President 
The president of the party conducts the general activity of the party, the activity of the National Executive Committee and the National Permanent Bureau and responds to the Congress on the general work of the PSD. The president is elected by secret vote by the Congress for a four-year mandate and represents the party in the Romanian society, in relations with the central and local public authorities, as well as with other parties or organizations in the country or abroad.

Honorary President 
PSD Honorary President is nominated by Congress for the four-year mandate of the party's recognized personalities. The Honorary President of the PSD participates with the right to vote in the work of the national governing bodies.

Secretary-General 
The Secretary-General manages the functional services at the central level and the relationship with the county and Bucharest organizations. It coordinates the Executive Secretariat of the PSD with 7 to 9 executive secretaries. Executive secretaries shall be appointed by the National Executive Committee, on a proposal from the chair, after consulting the Secretary-General.

Permanent National Bureau 
The Permanent National Bureau is the operative body for analyzing and deciding the party. It has the following composition: PSD President, PSD Honorary President, PSD Secretary General, PSD Deputy Chairpersons. At the National Permanent Bureau, the chairman of the National Council, the leaders of the parliamentary groups, the presidents of women and youth organizations, the treasurer, the director of the Social Democratic Institute, the representative of the county administrative council presidents, the mayors of municipalities and the representative of the National League of Mayors and PSD Councilors participate. The National Permanent Bureau meets weekly, usually Monday.

The Permanent National Bureau have the following duties:
 To organize and direct the entire activity of the party according to the decisions adopted as appropriate by the Congress, the National Council, and the National Executive Committee.
 Drafts draft decisions that it submits to the debate and adoption of the National Executive Committee.
 Orientates the work of parliamentary groups.
 Establishes and coordinates working committees on doctrine, electoral programs, and strategies.
 Establishes and co-ordinates political analysis groups of the economic, social, domestic and international situation.
 Manages the party's patrimony.

National Executive Committee 
Coordinates the entire activity of the party between the meetings of the National Council. The PSD National Executive Committee analyzes, debates and decides on the fundamental issues of the Party's work on: the program, the electoral strategy, the political and electoral alliances, the governing program, the structure and the nominal composition of the Government, the validation of the party's preliminary election for the nomination of candidates for senators, MEPs, MEPs, and elected local, merging by absorption or merging with other parties; PSD collaboration agreements with trade unions and employers' confederations; the strategy of selecting, preparing, training and promoting the party's human resources, organizing and conducting internal party choices, coordinating the activities of the Youth Organization and the Women's Organization.

The adopted decisions are validated by the National Council. The National Executive Committee consists of PSD President, PSD Honorary President, PSD Secretary General, PSD Vice Presidents, President of the National Council, Presidents of County Organizations, Sectors and the Bucharest Municipality Organization, the President of the Women's Organization and the President of the Youth Organization.

National Council 

The National Council is the governing body of the party in the interval between two congresses. It consists of a maximum of 751 members elected from the candidates nominated by the County and Bucharest Conferences, or proposed by the Congress. The National Council elects and revokes by secret vote the President of the National Council and the treasurer, validates the composition of the National Executive Committee and The Permanent National Bureau; decides to conclude political alliances as well as merge by merging or absorbing with other political parties or political parties; to hear the activity reports submitted by members of the Permanent National Bureau, by the Chairman of the Commission for Arbitration and Moral Integrity, by the President of the National Commission for Financial Control and Treasurer and decides accordingly on the basis of the mandate given by the Congress, according to the provisions of the Statute; is responsible for organizing presidential, parliamentary, euro-parliamentary and local electoral campaigns; analyzes the work of parliamentary groups, women's and youth organizations, the National League of Mayors and PSD Councilors; validates the decisions of the National Executive Committee on the Governance Program and confirms the proposals of members of the Government; resolve the appeals lodged against the decisions of the councils of the county organizations or of the Bucharest municipality; resolves the divergences between the Councils of the County Organizations, respectively the Bucharest Municipality Organization and the National Executive Committee in connection with the nomination of the candidates for the legislative elections, if they persist; approves the party's annual revenue and expenditure budget, decides on its execution.

The PSD National Council meets annually and whenever needed. Deputies, senators and MEPs who are not members of the National Council participate in its meetings without the right to vote. The National Council may decide, on a proposal from the Permanent National Bureau, to organize forums, leagues, associations, clubs and other such bodies for the promotion of strategies in the PSD Political Program, in the Romanian society and in partnership with the trade unions. The party-union relationship as well as the concrete ways of collaboration will be established by the National Permanent Bureau. Within the PSD there are: the National Workers' Forum; National Farmers Forum; National Ecologists' Forum; The National Forum of Scientists, Culture and Art and the Pensioners' League. In order to develop PSD programs and strategies in the field of party life, consultative councils can be set up on: political analysis, image and relations with the media; organization and human resources. The Consultative Council for the Problems of National Minorities of the PSD carries out activities to identify the specific problems faced by national minorities in Romania and develops appropriate solutions and proposals for their resolution.

Congress 
The supreme governing party of the Social Democratic Party is the Congress, which is convened every four years or in extraordinary cases. The PSD Congress is made up of elected delegates by secret ballot by the County Conferences and the Bucharest Municipality and has the following attributions: adopting or modifying the PSD Statute and the Political Program of the Party; sets out the party's guidelines, strategy and tactics for the period between two congresses; elects the party chairman, the vice-presidents, the general secretary, the other members of the National Council, the National Commission for Arbitration and Moral Integrity and the National Commission for Financial Control; appoints the PSD candidate to the position of President of Romania and the Prime Minister in the event of winning the elections; resolves possible appeals against decisions of other PSD central bodies.

Party leadership 

 Notes
1 Roman subsequently served as Senate President between November 1996 to December 1999.

2 Năstase served twice as Chamber President, the first term from March 1992 to May 1996, while the second from December 2004 to March 2006.

Presidents 

 Oliviu Gherman: 1992–1996 (FDSN/PDSR);
 Ion Iliescu: 1992, 1997–2000 (PDSR);
 Adrian Năstase: 2000–2005 (acting/ad interim until 2001) (PDSR/PSD);
 Mircea Geoană: 2005–2010 (PSD);
 Victor Ponta: 2010–2015 (PSD);
 Rovana Plumb: 2015 (acting/ad interim) (PSD);
 Liviu Dragnea: 2015–2019 (PSD);
 Viorica Dăncilă: 2019 (PSD);
 Marcel Ciolacu: 2019–present (acting/ad interim until 2020) (PSD).

Executive presidents 

 Adrian Năstase: 1993–1997;
 position abolished 1997–2003;
 Octav Cozmâncă: 2003–2005;
 Adrian Năstase: 2005–2006;
 : 2005–2006, when the office was dissolved (nominated acting/ad interim after the resignation of Adrian Năstase from the office);
 position abolished 2006–2013;
 Liviu Dragnea: 2013–2015;
 Valeriu Zgonea: 2015–2016;
 : 2016–2018;
 Viorica Dăncilă: 2018–2019;
 Paul Stănescu: 2019 (acting/ad interim);
 : 2019;
 position abolished: 2019–present.

Notable members

Current notable members 

 Ion Iliescu, founder of the party the party FDSN which then became PDSR and ultimately as PSD, former President of Romania, and Honorary President of PSD;
 Nicolae Văcăroiu, former Prime Minister of Romania;
 Alexandru Athanasiu, former acting Prime Minister;
 Viorel Hrebenciuc, former deputy;
 Eugen Bejinariu, former acting Prime Minister;
 Ilie Sârbu, former President of the Senate;
 Paul Stănescu, former Deputy Prime Minister as well as Minister of Regional Development;
 Ecaterina Andronescu, former Minister of Education;
 Marcel Ciolacu, current president of the party since 2019 onwards;
 Gabriela Firea, former Mayor of Bucharest;
 Titus Corlățean, Minister of Foreign Affairs, Minister of Justice;
 Rovana Plumb, MEP, Minister of Environment, Minister of Labour;
 Mihai Tudose, former Prime Minister of Romania;
 Sorin Grindeanu, former Prime Minister of Romania;
 Mihai Fifor, former acting Prime Minister of Romania;
 Dan Nica, former deputy and current MEP;
 Lia Olguța Vasilescu, Mayor of Craiova, Minister of Labour;
 Alexandru Rafila, current Health Minister.

Former notable members 

 Gabriel Oprea, former army general (now general in army reserves), former Minister of National Defence, former Deputy Prime Minister of Romania, former Minister of Internal Affairs, former acting Prime Minister of Romania;
 Corina Crețu, former European Commissioner for Cohesion and Reforms;
 Viorica Dăncilă, former president of the party, former Prime Minister of Romania;
 Adrian Năstase, former president of the party, former Prime Minister of Romania as well as former Minister of Foreign Affairs;
 Teodor Meleșcanu, former Minister of Defence, former acting Minister of Justice, former Director of the Foreign Intelligence; Service (SRI), former Minister of Foreign Affairs three times, former President of the Senate;
 Robert Negoiță, former Mayor of the 3rd Sector of Bucharest;
 Mircea Geoană, former president of the party, former President of the Senate as well as former Minister of Foreign Affairs;
 Sorin Oprescu, former Mayor of Bucharest;
 Marian Vanghelie, former Mayor of the 5th Sector of Bucharest;
 Radu Mazăre, former Mayor of Constanța;
 Victor Ponta, former president of the party as well as former Prime Minister of Romania;
 Valeriu Zgonea, former President of the Chamber of Deputies;
 Liviu Dragnea, former president of the party as well as former President of the Chamber of Deputies;
 Oliviu Gherman, former president of the party as well as former President of the Chamber of Deputies;
 Șerban Valeca, acting President of the Senate;
 Hildegard Puwak, former Minister for European Integration;
 Antonie Iorgovan, lead author of the 1991 Romanian Constitution;
 Cristian Diaconescu, former State Secretary at the Ministry of Foreign Affairs, former Minister of Justice, former Minister of Foreign Affairs twice.

Electoral history

Legislative elections 

 Notes
1 Social Democratic Pole of Romania members: PDSR, PSDR (2 senators and 10 deputies), and PUR (4 senators and 6 deputies).

2 National Union PSD+PUR members: PSD and PUR (11 senators and 19 deputies).

3 Soon after the elections, PUR broke the alliance with the PSD and switched sides, joining the government led by the Justice and Truth Alliance (DA).

4 Alliance PSD+PC members: PSD and PC (1 senator and 4 deputies).

5 The Social Liberal Union (USL) was an alliance consisting of two smaller alliances, more specifically the Centre Left Alliance (ACS) and the Centre Right Alliance (ACD). The members of the Centre Left Alliance (ACS) were the PSD and the UNPR (5 senators and 10 deputies) whereas the members of the Centre Right Alliance (ACD) were the PNL (50 senators and 100 deputies) and the PC (8 senators and 13 deputies).

Local elections

County council elections

Mayor of Bucharest elections 

 Notes
1 Independent candidate endorsed by the USL

Presidential elections

European Parliament elections 

 Notes
1 Alliance PSD+PC members: PSD and PC (1 MEP).

2 Social Democractic Union (USD) members: PSD, PC (2 MEPs), and UNPR (2 MEPs).

Controversies 
Political opponents have criticised PSD for harbouring former Romanian Communist Party (PCR) officials, and for allegedly attempting to control the Romanian mass media. By 2009, a number of its incumbent or former senior members have also been accused of corruption, interfering in the judiciary and using their political positions for personal enrichment. As of 2015, founding member Ion Iliescu is facing prosecution on charges of crimes against humanity for his role in the June 1990 Mineriad, while former president Liviu Dragnea was convicted for electoral fraud and for instigation to the abuse of public office and being indicted for forming an "organised criminal group" in 2018. That same year, former president Victor Ponta had also been investigated for corruption but was ultimately acquitted. Adrian Năstase temporarily self-suspended himself from the position on 16 January 2006, pending investigation of a scandal provoked by his wealth declaration, where he was accused of corruption. Alleged text transcripts of PSD meetings surfaced on an anonymous website just before the 2004 Romanian general election. Năstase and his ministers are shown talking about political involvement in corruption trials of the government's members, or involvement in suppressing "disobedient" media. Năstase stated that the transcripts were fake, but several party members, including former PSD president and former foreign minister Mircea Geoană, have said they are genuine, though Geoană later retracted his statement. Security expert Iulian Fota stated that PSD is an neocommunist anti-Western party backed by Russia.

Politicians of the party have occasionally employed "utilitarian anti-Semitism", meaning that politicians who may usually not be antisemites played off certain antisemitic prejudices in order to serve their political necessities. On 5 March 2012, PSD Senator Dan Șova, at that time the party spokesman, said on The Money Channel that "no Jew suffered on Romanian territory, thanks to marshal Antonescu." Elie Wiesel National Institute for Studying the Holocaust in Romania expressed its deep disagreement and indignation over the statements of the spokesman of the party. Following public outcry, Șova retracted his statement and issued a public apology; nevertheless, the chairman of the party, Victor Ponta, announced his removal from the office of party spokesman.

Between 2017 and 2019, the party, along with its former junior coalition partners, more specifically the Alliance of Liberals and Democrats (ALDE) and the Democratic Alliance of Hungarians in Romania (UDMR/RMDSZ), had unsuccessfully tried to pass a series of tremendously controversial laws related to the judicial system. In a 2018 preliminary opinion, the Venice Commission stated that the changes could severely undermine the independence of judges and prosecutors in Romania. This unsuccessful endeavour committed by the former PSD–ALDE coalition was the basis for the nationwide 2017–2019 Romanian protests, the largest in the country's entire history thus far.

See also 
 Politics of Romania

References

External links 

 Official website

 
1992 establishments in Romania
Full member parties of the Socialist International
Party of European Socialists member parties
Political parties established in 1992
Progressive Alliance
Registered political parties in Romania
Social democratic parties in Romania